Lago Colina Dam (Spanish: Presa Lago Colina) is a concrete and earth-embankment gravity dam on the Rio Conchos in Chihuahua, Mexico. The dam forms Lake Colina. Its primary purpose is to divert water for irrigation, and regulate the outflow of the larger La Boquilla Dam upstream.

See also
List of dams and reservoirs#Mexico
List of lakes in Mexico

Dams in Mexico
Gravity dams